Rachel Claudio is a singer/songwriter, DJ, and live performing musical artist from Perth, Australia.

Early life
Claudio was born and raised in Perth with an Italian heritage. After establishing herself as a DJ in Perth she moved to Paris, aged around 23.

She performs her music by singing, sampling and mixing live while manipulating an array of musical production technology. Claudio's grandfather impressed her with a fondness for musical styles such as Italian opera and The Beatles, and she spent a portion of her childhood indoors with piano music, playing and composing.

Career
Claudio has performed for artistic productions such as The Luxury of Landscape, a multi-discipline art installation in Florence, Italy, featuring floral art, photography, music and fashion. Claudio contributed to Luxury of Landscape with a group of artists selected and led by fashion designer and financier Aneka Manners, but alas did not appear at the installation in person, claiming to be "too pregnant to fly" at the time. Claudio appeared on the French TF1 television channel version of The Voice where she received a standing ovation for singing "Message in a Bottle" by Police.

A TEDxPerth live performance and speech by Claudio about translating emotions into sound has received almost 1 million views between February 2017 and March 2020.

Claudio travels the world performing and supporting many popular music acts. Her style of performance is achieved by electronic live sampling with keyboards, creating beats and backing music on the fly and combining them with her singing. As of 2006, Claudio lives in Paris, France.

Discography

Albums

Extended plays

Awards

WAM Song of the Year
The WAM Song of the Year was formed by the Western Australian Rock Music Industry Association Inc. (WARMIA) in 1985, with its main aim to develop and run annual awards recognising achievements within the music industry in Western Australia.
 
 (wins only)
|-
| 2006
| "These Times" 
| Electronic/Dance
| 
|-

References

Australian women singer-songwriters
Australian keyboardists
Australian electronic musicians
Australian women in electronic music
Australian DJs
Year of birth missing (living people)
Living people